Arraiolos is a municipality in Évora District in Portugal. The population in 2011 was 7,363, in an area of 683.75 km2. The town of Arraiolos has 3,351 inhabitants. The present Mayor is Silvia Pinto, elected by the Unitary Democratic Coalition.

The town is famous for  its castle and its embroidered wool rugs and carpets. Arraiolos rugs have been made since the Middle Ages.

In October 2003, Jorge Sampaio, the then President of Portugal, invited the Presidents of Finland, Germany, as well as of soon-to-be EU members Hungary, Latvia and Poland to Arraiolos in order to discuss the consequences of the 2004 enlargement of the European Union and plans for a Constitution for Europe. Subsequent meetings of non-executive presidents of European Union member states have been dubbed Arraiolos meetings.

History
A hoard of prehistoric objects, including a trapezoid-shaped plaque with geometric design and three pottery vessels, was excavated from a tumulus or barrow in Arraiolos at the beginning of the twentieth century. They are now kept at the British Museum.

See also
Vendas Novas for similar hoard

Parishes
Administratively, the municipality is divided into 5 civil parishes (freguesias):
 Arraiolos
 Gafanhoeira e Sabugueiro
 Igrejinha
 São Gregório e Santa Justa
 Vimieiro

Notable people 
 Joaquim Heliodoro da Cunha Rivara (1809 in Arraiolos – 1879 in Évora) a physician, professor, intellectual and politician
 Francisco José Caeiro (1890 in Vimieiro – 1976) a politician and former Minister and law professor.

Gallery

References

External links

Town Hall official website
Photos of ARRAIOLOS

 
Towns in Portugal
Municipalities of Évora District